Baikie is a surname. Notable people with the surname include:

David Baikie, Scottish former football player
Iain Baikie (born 1960), Scottish physicist
Jim Baikie, Scottish comics artist
Mary Anne Baikie (1861-1950), Scottish suffragist
Peter Baikie (born 1957), Scottish comedian and composer
Robert Baikie (died 1817), Scottish politician from Orkney, Member of Parliament (MP) for Orkney and Shetland 1780-81 
William Balfour Baikie (1824–1864), Scottish explorer, naturalist, and philologist